Rhabdotina is a genus of moths of the family Erebidae. The genus was erected by George Hampson in 1926.

Species
Rhabdotina phoenicias Hampson, 1918
Rhabdotina purpurascens Schaus, 1911

References

Calpinae
Noctuoidea genera